Chemical Plant Karpov is a Russian chemical plant in Mendeleyevsk, Tatarstan. JSC Chemical Plant Karpov is a joint stock company which runs the oldest chemical plant in Russia. The company was named after Lev Karpov.

History
The plant was founded by Kapiton Ushkov.

References

Companies based in Tatarstan
Companies established in 1868
Chemical companies of Russia
Chemical companies of the Soviet Union
Companies nationalised by the Soviet Union